Beyrichoceras is a genus belonging to the goniatitid family Maxigoniatitidae that lived during the Mississippian Period (Early Carboniferous)

Description
Beyrichoceras can be recognized by its small, thickly discoidal shell with small umbilicus, deep dorsal impression, arched flanks and rounded venter   The ventral lobe of the suture is bifurcated, wide at its base, narrowing apically, ending in a pair of outwardly turned prongs separated by a low median saddle. The first lateral lobe is similar in size to the ventral lobe; broad, V-shaped, and more or less symmetrical.  The umbilical lobe, like the first lateral lobe, is broad, V-shaped, and fairly symmetrical, only much shallower. The dorsal lobe is long and narrow, closely flanked by narrow internal lobes.

Taxonomic position
Beyrichoceras is assigned to the Maximitidae, although some authors have assigned it to the Muensteroceratidae or Anthracoceratidae. Miller and Furnish  included Beyrichoceras in the subfamily Goniatitinae, family Goniatitidae, and superfamily Goniatitaceae. The Maxigoniatitidae, established by Korn, Klug & Mapes, 1999, is based on Goniatites maximus var. saourensis Pareyn, 1961, renamed Maxigoniatites

Distribution and range
Beyrichoceras is found in middle Lower Carboniferous ( Mississippian upper Osagean-Meremacian equivalent) strata  in North America, Europe, and North Africa.

Paleoecology
Beyrichoceras has been described as a "fast-moving nektonic carnivore". Its small, involutely coiled form nevertheless suggest a floating nektonic or nekto-benthic stalker capable to sudden swift maneuvering. As with all known cephalopods, Beyrichoceras was undoubtedly carnivorous.

References

Goniatitida genera
Ammonites of Europe
Mississippian ammonites
Pericyclaceae